Stephen Báthory at Pskov or Báthory at Pskov (Polish - Stefan Batory pod Pskowem) is a partially allegorical historical painting 1872  by the Polish artist Jan Matejko, now in the collections of the Royal Castle in Warsaw, Poland. It shows people of the Russian tsar Ivan the Terrible kneeling before the Polish king Stephen Báthory at Pskov during the final period of peace negotiations at the end of the 1578-1582 Livonian campaign. It also shows the papal legate, the black-robed Jesuit Antonio Possevino.

Matejko exhibited it in Prague and for it was made an academician of the Academy of Fine Arts in Prague and an honorary foreign member of the French Académie des Beaux-Arts, as well as winning a Medal of Arts from the Academy of Fine Arts in Vienna. It and Rejtan were seized by the Germans during World War II and hurriedly evacuated in 1944, leaving them both badly damaged. They were both rediscovered in the village of Przesieka near Jelenia Góra professor Stanislaw Lorentz and their restoration took three years.

The painting depicts the events only metaphorically, as part of a broader narrative depicting the significance of the event outside of its immediate context.

References

1872 paintings
Paintings by Jan Matejko
Paintings in the collection of the Royal Castle, Warsaw
Cultural depictions of Polish men
Cultural depictions of kings